In statistics and information theory, the expected formation matrix of a likelihood function  is the matrix inverse of the Fisher information matrix of , while the observed formation matrix of  is the inverse of the observed information matrix of .

Currently, no notation for dealing with formation matrices is widely used, but in books and articles by Ole E. Barndorff-Nielsen and Peter McCullagh, the symbol  is used to denote the element of the i-th line and j-th column of the observed formation matrix. The geometric interpretation of the Fisher information matrix (metric) leads to a notation of  following the notation of the (contravariant) metric tensor in differential geometry. The Fisher information metric is denoted by  so that using Einstein notation we have .

These matrices appear naturally in the asymptotic expansion of the distribution of many statistics related to the likelihood ratio.

See also 
Fisher information
Shannon entropy

Notes

References 
Barndorff-Nielsen, O.E., Cox, D.R. (1989), Asymptotic Techniques for Use in Statistics, Chapman and Hall, London. 
Barndorff-Nielsen, O.E., Cox, D.R., (1994). Inference and Asymptotics. Chapman & Hall, London. 
P. McCullagh, "Tensor Methods in Statistics", Monographs on Statistics and Applied Probability, Chapman and Hall, 1987.
Edwards, A.W.F. (1984) Likelihood. CUP. 

Estimation theory
Information theory